The prime minister of Italy,  officially the president of the Council of Ministers, is the head of government of the Italian Republic. The office of president of the Council of Ministers is established by articles 92–96 of the Constitution of Italy; the president of the Council of Ministers is appointed by the president of the Republic and must have the confidence of the Parliament to stay in office.

Prior to the establishment of the Italian Republic, the position was called President of the Council of Ministers of the Kingdom of Italy (Presidente del Consiglio dei ministri del Regno d'Italia). From 1925 to 1943 during the Fascist regime, the position was transformed into the dictatorial position of Head of the Government, Prime Minister Secretary of State (Capo del Governo, Primo Ministro Segretario di Stato) held by Benito Mussolini, Duce of Fascism, who officially governed on the behalf of the king of Italy. King Victor Emmanuel III removed Mussolini from office in 1943 and the position was restored with Marshal Pietro Badoglio becoming prime minister in 1943, although the original denomination of President of the Council was only restored in 1944, when Ivanoe Bonomi was appointed to the post of prime minister. Alcide De Gasperi became the first prime minister of the Italian Republic in 1946.

The prime minister is the president of the Council of Ministers which holds executive power and the position is similar to those in most other parliamentary systems. The formal Italian order of precedence lists the office as being, ceremonially, the fourth-highest Italian state office after the president and the presiding officers of the two houses of parliament.

Giorgia Meloni is the incumbent prime minister since 22 October 2022.

Functions 
As the president of the Council of Ministers, the prime minister is required by the Constitution to have the supreme confidence of the majority of the voting members of the Parliament.

In addition to powers inherent in being a member of the Cabinet, the prime minister holds specific powers, most notably being able to nominate a list of Cabinet ministers to be appointed by the president of the Republic and the countersigning of all legislative instruments having the force of law that are signed by the president of the Republic.

Article 95 of the Italian constitution provides that the prime minister "directs and coordinates the activity of the ministers". This power has been used to a quite variable extent in the history of the Italian state as it is strongly influenced by the political strength of individual ministers and thus by the parties they represent.

The prime minister's activity has often consisted of mediating between the various parties in the majority coalition, rather than directing the activity of the Council of Ministers. The prime minister's supervisory power is further limited by the lack of any formal authority to fire ministers. In the past, in order to  make a cabinet reshuffle, prime ministers have sometimes resigned so that they could be re-appointed by the president and allowed to form a new cabinet with new ministers. In order to do this the prime minister needs the support of the president, who could theoretically refuse to re-appoint them following their resignation.

History 

The office was first established in 1848 in Italy's predecessor state, the Kingdom of Sardinia—although it was not mentioned in its constitution, the Albertine Statute. From 1848 to 1861, ten prime ministers governed the Kingdom, most of them being right-wing politicians.

Historical Right and Historical Left 

After the unification of Italy and the establishment of the kingdom, the procedure did not change. In fact, the candidate for office was appointed by the King and presided over a very unstable political system. The first prime minister was Camillo Benso di Cavour, who was appointed on 23 March 1861, but he died on 6 June the same year. From 1861 to 1911, Historical Right and Historical Left prime ministers alternatively governed the country.

One of the most famous and influential prime ministers of this period was Francesco Crispi, a left-wing patriot and statesman, the first head of the government from Southern Italy. He led the country for six years from 1887 until 1891 and again from 1893 until 1896. Crispi was internationally famous and often mentioned along with world statesmen such as Otto von Bismarck, William Ewart Gladstone and Salisbury.

Originally an enlightened Italian patriot and democrat liberal, Crispi went on to become a bellicose authoritarian prime minister, ally and admirer of Bismarck. His career ended amid controversy and failure due to becoming involved in a major banking scandal and subsequently fell from power in 1896 after a devastating colonial defeat in Ethiopia. He is often seen as a precursor of the fascist dictator Benito Mussolini.

Giolittian Era 
In 1892, Giovanni Giolitti, a leftist lawyer and politician, was appointed Prime Minister by King Umberto I, but after less than a year he was forced to resign and Crispi returned to power. In 1903, he was appointed again head of the government after a period of instability. Giolitti was Prime Minister five times between 1892 and 1921 and the second-longest serving prime minister in Italian history.

Giolitti was a master in the political art of trasformismo, the method of making a flexible, fluid centrist coalition in Parliament which sought to isolate the extremes of the left and the right in Italian politics. Under his influence, the Italian Liberals did not develop as a structured party. They were instead a series of informal personal groupings with no formal links to political constituencies.

The period between the start of the 20th century and the start of World War I, when he was Prime Minister and Minister of the Interior from 1901 to 1914 with only brief interruptions, is often called the Giolittian Era. A left-wing liberal with strong ethical concerns, Giolitti's periods in the office were notable for the passage of a wide range of progressive social reforms which improved the living standards of ordinary Italians, together with the enactment of several policies of government intervention.

Besides putting in place several tariffs, subsidies and government projects, Giolitti also nationalized the private telephone and railroad operators. Liberal proponents of free trade criticized the "Giolittian System", although Giolitti himself saw the development of the national economy as essential in the production of wealth.

Fascist regime 

The Italian prime minister presided over a very unstable political system as in its first sixty years of existence (1861–1921) Italy changed its head of the government 37 times.

Regarding this situation, the first goal of Benito Mussolini, appointed in 1922, was to abolish the Parliament's ability to put him to a vote of no confidence, basing his power on the will of the King and the National Fascist Party alone. After destroying all political opposition through his secret police and outlawing labor strikes, Mussolini and his Fascist followers consolidated their power through a series of laws that transformed the nation into a one-party dictatorship. Within five years, he had established dictatorial authority by both legal and extraordinary means, aspiring to create a totalitarian state. In 1925 the title of "President of the Council of Ministers" was changed into "Head of the Government, Prime Minister Secretary of State", symbolizing the new dictatorial powers of Mussolini.

Mussolini remained in power until he was deposed by King Victor Emmanuel III in 1943 following a vote of no confidence by the Grand Council of Fascism and replaced by General Pietro Badoglio. A few months later, Italy was invaded by Nazi Germany and Mussolini was reinstated as head of a puppet State called Italian Social Republic, while the authorities of the Kingdom were forced to relocate in Southern Italy, which was under the control of the Allied Forces. 

In 1944 Badoglio resigned and Ivanoe Bonomi was appointed to the post of Prime Minister, restoring the old title of "President of the Council of Ministers. Bonomi was briefly succeeded by Ferruccio Parri in 1945 and then by Alcide de Gasperi, leader of the newly formed Christian Democracy (Democrazia Cristiana, DC) political party.

First decades of the Italian Republic 

Following the 1946 Italian institutional referendum, the monarchy was abolished and De Gasperi became the first Prime Minister of the Italian Republic. The First Republic was dominated by the Christian Democracy which was the senior party in each government coalitions from 1946 to 1994 while the opposition was led by the Italian Communist Party (PCI), the largest one in Western Europe.

In the first years of the Republic, the governments were led by De Gasperi, who is also considered a founding father of the European Union.

After the death of De Gasperi, Italy returned in a period of political instability and a lot of cabinets were formed in few decades. The second part of the 20th century was dominated by De Gasperi's protégé Giulio Andreotti, who was appointed Prime Minister seven times from 1972 to 1992.

From the late 1960s until the early 1980s, the country experienced the Years of Lead, a period characterised by economic crisis (especially after the 1973 oil crisis), widespread social conflicts and terrorist massacres carried out by opposing extremist groups, with the alleged involvement of United States and Soviet intelligence. The Years of Lead culminated in the assassination of the Christian Democrat leader Aldo Moro in 1978 and the Bologna railway station massacre in 1980, where 85 people died.

In the 1980s, for the first time since 1945 two governments were led by non-Christian Democrat prime ministers: one Republican (Giovanni Spadolini) and one Socialist (Bettino Craxi). However, the Christian Democrats remained the main government party. During Craxi's government, the economy recovered and Italy became the world's fifth-largest industrial nation, gaining entry into the Group of Seven, but as a result of his spending policies, the Italian national debt skyrocketed during the Craxi era, soon passing 100% of the GDP.

In the early 1990s, Italy faced significant challenges as voters—disenchanted with political paralysis, massive public debt and the extensive corruption system (known as Tangentopoli) uncovered by the "Clean Hands" (mani pulite) investigation—demanded radical reforms. The scandals involved all major parties, but especially those in the government coalition: the Christian Democrats, who ruled for almost 50 years, underwent a severe crisis and eventually disbanded, splitting up into several factions. Moreover, the Communist Party was reorganised as a social-democratic force, the Democratic Party of the Left.

The "Second Republic" 

In the midst of the mani pulite operation which shook political parties in 1994, media magnate Silvio Berlusconi, owner of three private TV channels, founded Forza Italia (Forward Italy) party and won the elections, becoming one of Italy's most important political and economic figures for the next decade. Berlusconi is also the longest-serving prime minister in the history of the Italian Republic and the third-longest serving in the whole history after Mussolini and Giolitti.

Ousted after a few months of government, Berlusconi returned to power in 2001, lost the 2006 general election five years later to Romano Prodi and his Union coalition, but won the 2008 general election and was elected Prime Minister for the third time in May 2008. In November 2011, Berlusconi lost his majority in the Chamber of Deputies and resigned. His successor, Mario Monti, formed a new government, composed of "technicians" and supported by both the center-left and the center-right. In April 2013, after the general election in February, the Vice Secretary of the Democratic Party (PD) Enrico Letta led a government composed by both center-left and the center-right.

On 22 February 2014, after tensions in the Democratic Party the PD's Secretary Matteo Renzi was sworn in as the new prime minister. Renzi proposed several reforms, including a radical overhaul of the Senate and a new electoral law. However, the proposed reforms were rejected on 4 December 2016 by a referendum. Following the referendum's results, Renzi resigned and his Foreign Affairs Minister Paolo Gentiloni was appointed new Prime Minister.
On 1 June 2018, after the 2018 Italian general election where the anti-establishment Five Star Movement become the largest party in Parliament, Giuseppe Conte (leader of Five Star) was sworn in as Prime Minister, at the head of a populist coalition of Five Star Movement and the League.

After the 2019 European Parliament election in Italy, where the League exceeded Five Star Movement, Matteo Salvini (leader of the League) proposed a no-confidence vote in Conte. Conte resigned, but after the consultations between the President Sergio Mattarella and the political parties, Conte was reappointed as Prime Minister, heading a government of the Five Star Movement and the Democratic Party of Nicola Zingaretti.

In January 2021, the centrist party Italia Viva, led by former Prime Minister Renzi, withdrew its support to Conte's government. In February 2021, President Mattarella appointed Mario Draghi, former President of the European Central Bank, Prime Minister. His new cabinet was supported by most Italian parties, including the League, M5S, PD, and FI.

In October 2022, President Mattarella appointed Giorgia Meloni as Italy's first female Prime Minister, following the resignation of Mario Draghi amidst a government crisis and a general election.

See also 
 List of prime ministers of Italy
 List of prime ministers of Italy by time in office
 List of international trips made by prime ministers of Italy
 Deputy Prime Minister of Italy

References

External links 
 Website of the Prime Minister of Italy
 List of Italian Prime Ministers, with information on length of term and party membership

 
Politics of Italy
1861 establishments in Italy
Articles which contain graphical timelines

la:Praeses consilii ministrorum
zh:意大利总理